Yuganskneftegaz is a wholly integrated subsidiary of Rosneft that owns and operates the second largest oil production complex in Russia.  It was formerly the most important production subsidiary of Yukos, but was expropriated by the Russian government and given to Rosneft, a state-owned company.

Background
Yuganskneftegaz began operations in 1964, and saw significant upgrades in the 1990s that are responsible for bringing its production to their current levels. Yuganskneftegaz was formerly owned by Yukos, which was broken up and its principal assets sold off to satisfy tax debts allegedly totaling $28 billion. On 19 December 2004, Yuganskneftegaz was sold at a state-run auction, ostensibly to satisfy tax debts. The winning, and sole, bidder, was a little-known Russian oil company called Baikal Finance Group, who paid $9.7 billion. It was later revealed that the previously unheard-of Baikal Finance Group is a group of Kremlin insiders headed by Igor Sechin, Deputy Head of the Presidential Administration and a close associate of President Vladimir Putin. On 22 December 2004, Baikalfinansgrup was purchased by Rosneft, a wholly state-owned Russian oil company. Sechin has been Chairman of Rosneft's Board of Directors since July 2004. The de facto nationalization of Yuganskneftegaz was denounced by Andrei Illarionov, then a senior Putin economic advisor, as "the scam of the year."

Complex
Yuganskneftegaz is located in the Khanty–Mansi Autonomous Okrug of Western Siberia. With  of proven oil reserves, Yuganskneftegaz was the largest Yukos production complex. Its main oil fields are Priobskoye, Prirazlomnoye, Mamontovskoye, Malo-Balykskoye, and Salymskoye. According to the annual audit by DeGolyer and MacNaughton, as of 31 December 2006, Yuganskneftegaz' two largest fields, Priobskoye and Prirazlomnoye, contained 33% and 10.7% of Rosneft’s total proved reserves, respectively.

In 2005, Yuganskneftegaz built and began operating the Booster Pipeline Pumping Station (BPPS) at the Ust-Balykskoye field, six preliminary water removal units (PWRU) and two group pumping stations. In 2006, Yuganskneftegaz began operating eight group pumping stations, an oil pumping station at the Prirazlomnoye field, another preliminary water removal unit, an external oil pipeline and six additional power generating stations. At the Priobskoye field, another oil production plant was set up and is now operating.

Selected fields

Notes:
 1. USGS 2002 (Bbbl = "billion barrels of oil"). 2. LOF = large oil fields (>100 million barrels of oil equivalent): GOF = giant oil fields (>500 million barrels of oil equivalent).

Notes

References

Stuart D. Goldman (2006) CRS Report for Congress
Bernard A. Gelb (2006) Russian Oil and Gas Challenges
Energy Information Administration (EIA). Russia Country Analysis Brief,
Yukos Receives Bill for Nearly $1 Billion in Back Taxes October 2004

External links

Rosneft site - English language

Oil companies of Russia
Natural gas companies of Russia
Oil companies of the Soviet Union
Natural gas companies of the Soviet Union
Yukos
Rosneft